Wield is a civil parish in Hampshire, England, within the district of East Hampshire. It includes two neighbouring villages, Upper Wield and Lower Wield. At the 2011 Census the population was 254.

The parish council meets quarterly at the parish hall in Upper Wield.

Wield as a civil parish is separate from the church parish. The parish church, dedicated to St James, is also in Upper Wield.  It is mainly Norman, and is a Grade I listed building.

Gallery

References

External links

 Victoria County History of Hampshire

Civil parishes in Hampshire
East Hampshire District